Adele&Glenn are a two piece band from Sydney. They are Adele Pickvance and Glenn Thompson, formerly the rhythm section of the reformed Go-Betweens. Their first album Carrington Street was recorded in 2011 at Glenn Thompson's Horses Of Australia studio in Marrickville.

References 

Australian musical duos
Musical groups established in 2011
Glitterhouse Records artists
Male–female musical duos
2011 establishments in Australia